American musician Danny Gokey has released seven studio albums, one extended play, and fourteen singles. After finishing third place on the eighth season of the singing competition American Idol, Gokey released his debut album My Best Days in 2010. The album charted two singles on the Billboard Hot Country Songs charts. After a third single included only on an extended play, Gokey began recording contemporary Christian music, where he has had more commercial and chart success.

Studio albums

Extended plays

Singles

As featured artist

Promotional singles

Other charted songs

Music videos

As a lead artist

Notes

References

External links
 
 Sophia's Heart Foundation (Official charity website)

Discographies of American artists
Country music discographies
Christian music discographies